Riparia is a genus of  passerine birds in the swallow family Hirundinidae.

They are brown above and mainly white below, and all have a dark breast band. They are closely associated with water. They nest in tunnels which are usually excavated by the birds themselves in a natural sand bank or earth mound. They lay white eggs, which are incubated by both parents, in a nest of straw, grass, and feathers in a chamber at the end of the burrow. Some species breed colonially.
 
The cosmopolitan sand martin is almost completely migratory, breeding across temperate Eurasia and North America and wintering in the tropics. The other species are partial migrants or resident. Riparia martins, like other swallows, take insects in flight over water, grassland, or other open country.

Taxonomy
The genus Riparia was introduced by the German naturalist Johann Reinhold Forster in 1817 with the sand martin (Riparia riparia) as the type species. The genus name is from the Latin riparius which means "of the riverbank"; it is derived from the Latin ripa "riverbank".

The genus contains five species:

The genus formerly included the banded martin but this species is now placed in its own genus Neophedina.

Fossil record

Riparia minor (late Miocene of Polgardi, Hungary)

References

 
Hirundinidae
Bird genera
Taxa named by Thomas Ignatius Maria Forster